Mount Poinsur is located in the suburb of Borivali west, Mumbai and it is the site of St. Francis of Assisi Church, Mt. Poinsur.
It has the church "Our lady of Immaculate Conception" and the St. francis school run by the missionary brothers of Paulus Moritz.

Geography of Mumbai